Lobin Hembrom is an Indian politician and member of the Jharkhand Mukti Morcha. Hembrom is a member of the Jharkhand Legislative Assembly from the Borio constituency in Sahibganj district in 2009 and 2019.

References 

People from Sahibganj district
Jharkhand Mukti Morcha politicians
Living people
Jharkhand MLAs 2009–2014
Jharkhand MLAs 2019–2024
Year of birth missing (living people)